AFCC is an acronym for:
Air Force Communications Command, an old name for what is now the Air Force Communications Agency
Armed Forces Chaplaincy Center, U.S. military chaplain training, Ft. Jackson, Columbia, SC
Armed Forces Chaplaincy Centre, U.K. military chaplain training, Amport House, South of Andover, Great Britain
Association of Family and Conciliation Courts
Automotive Fuel Cell Cooperation
Australian Federation of Civil Celebrants
Australian Federation of Construction Contractors
Australian Financial and Career Consortium